Julius Doe Davies (born 30 September 1994) is a Sierra Leonean-Australian football (soccer) player, who last played for Melbourne Knights FC in the NPL Victoria.

Career

Club career
Whilst in Australia he played for Swan IC Football Club initially coached by renowned youth coach, John Ralph, in his first few months at the club and then, under the guidance of Mauro Marchione, Technical Director at Swan IC from 2002 to 2005, Julius started his football career playing two years under the Italian coach still at Swan and then in 2006 moving with him to Inglewood where he definitely made a huge step forward towards a professional career. In fact, at Inglewood, Julius won the u/15's Premier League and the State Cup resulting to be the best youth player of that year. In May 2007 Mauro Marchione organized a trial for Julius with AS ROMA and they both left Australia for a three week trial with the Italian club where Julius impressed the then Director of Coaching Daniele Prade` (now Director of Fiorentina) and the director of Football Bruno Conti, a world cup champion with Italy National team in 1982. Julius made a great impression but unfortunately he did not get picked as considered not yet ready for the level required. However, the trial put Julius in the spotlight so much so that, when back to Australia, he played with the Inglewood team a friendly game against the WA NTC in July 2007. After the game he got invited by the then U/17's Australia National Team coach Ange Postegoglou to join the youth national team for a tournament held in Los Angeles at the end of that year. Julius played so well that tournament that a Bayern Munich scout contacted Mauro who, beside being Julius' coach was also his legal guardian, to arrange for the transfer to Germany. Finally, in 2009 Julius went to Germany where he was offered a contract by Bayern Munich to play in the U17 team, which he scored nine goals from 20 appearances. He later moved to 1899 Hoffenheim only making five appearances in their U19 team, before returning to Australia at the age of seventeen.
He started training with Melbourne Victory and signed a youth contract with the club until the end of the 2011–12 A-League season.

Melbourne Victory
On 24 January 2012, it was confirmed that Davies had signed with Melbourne Victory after impressing the staff during his two weeks of training with the club. On 16 March 2012 it was confirmed that Davies was cleared to play for Melbourne Victory and on the same day made his professional debut for the club in a round 26 match against Wellington Phoenix at AAMI Park as an 81st-minute substitute for Harry Kewell in which Melbourne won 3–0, picking up an assist in the process. Julius then continued his stay at Melbourne Victory by signing an extension to 30 April 2013. On 9 January 2013, it was announced that he was to leave the club by mutual termination.

Brisbane Roar
On 9 January 2013, he signed with A-League club Brisbane Roar after his contract with Melbourne Victory was mutually terminated. Davies made his Brisbane Roar debut against the Western Sydney Wanderers at Suncorp Stadium in Brisbane on 20 January 2013, as an 81st-minute substitute for Ben Halloran. The Brisbane Roar gave Julius Doe Davies an early release before the start of the 2014/2015 A-League season to join Liga I outfit, Otelul Galati, in Romania.

Oţelul Galaţi
Julius Doe Davies joined Romanian Liga I outfit, Otelul Galati at the start of the 2014/2015 season.

NPL Victoria
Davies spent the 2015 season with Port Melbourne SC but was released at the end of that campaign. He joined Northcote City on the registration deadline day ahead of the 2016 season.

Melbourne Knights
On June 9, 2016, Davies signed with former National League champions Melbourne Knights during the NPL Victoria mid-season transfer window.

Personal life
Davies was born in Monrovia, Liberia. He came to Perth, Australia from Sierra Leone as an eleven-year-old refugee.

References
 http://www.fourfourtwo.com/au/news/brisbane-roar-bring-home-young-and-bowles

External links
 Ultimate A-League profile

1994 births
Living people
Sportspeople from Monrovia
Sierra Leonean footballers
Association football midfielders
A-League Men players
Brisbane Roar FC players
Melbourne Victory FC players
Australian expatriate soccer players
Australian soccer players
National Premier Leagues players
Port Melbourne SC players